The triple product rule, known variously as the cyclic chain rule, cyclic relation, cyclical rule or Euler's chain rule, is a formula which relates partial derivatives of three interdependent variables.  The rule finds application in thermodynamics, where frequently three variables can be related by a function of the form f(x, y, z) = 0, so each variable is given as an implicit function of the other two variables.  For example, an equation of state for a fluid relates temperature, pressure, and volume in this manner.  The triple product rule for such interrelated variables x, y, and z comes from using a reciprocity relation on the result of the implicit function theorem, and is given by

where each factor is a partial derivative of the variable in the numerator, considered to be a function of the other two.

The advantage of the triple product rule is that by rearranging terms, one can derive a number of substitution identities which allow one to replace partial derivatives which are difficult to analytically evaluate, experimentally measure, or integrate with quotients of partial derivatives which are easier to work with.  For example,

Various other forms of the rule are present in the literature; these can be derived by permuting the variables {x, y, z}.

Derivation 

An informal derivation follows.  Suppose that f(x, y, z) = 0.  Write z as a function of x and y.  Thus the total differential dz is

Suppose that we move along a curve with dz = 0, where the curve is parameterized by x.  Thus y can be written in terms of x, so on this curve

Therefore, the equation for dz = 0 becomes

Since this must be true for all dx, rearranging terms gives

Dividing by the derivatives on the right hand side gives the triple product rule

Note that this proof makes many implicit assumptions regarding the existence of partial derivatives, the existence of the exact differential dz, the ability to construct a curve in some neighborhood with dz = 0, and the nonzero value of partial derivatives and their reciprocals.  A formal proof based on mathematical analysis would eliminate these potential ambiguities.

Alternative derivation 
Write the total differentials of the variables

Substitute  into 

Subtracting the second term and multiplying by its inverse gives the triple product rule

Applications

Example: Ideal Gas Law
The ideal gas law relates the state variables of pressure (P), volume (V), and temperature (T) via

which can be written as

so each state variable can be written as an implicit function of the other state variables:

From the above expressions, we have

Geometric Realization

A geometric realization of the triple product rule can be found in its close ties to the velocity of a traveling wave 

shown on the right at time t (solid blue line) and at a short time later t+Δt (dashed). The wave maintains its shape as it propagates, so that a point at position x at time t will correspond to a point at position x+Δx at time t+Δt,

This equation can only be satisfied for all x and t if , resulting in the formula for the phase velocity

To elucidate the connection with the triple product rule, consider the point p1 at time t and its corresponding point (with the same height) p̄1 at t+Δt. Define p2 as the point at time t whose x-coordinate matches that of p̄1, and define p̄2 to be the corresponding point of p2 as shown in the figure on the right. The distance Δx between p1 and p̄1 is the same as the distance between p2 and p̄2 (green lines), and dividing this distance by Δt yields the speed of the wave.

To compute Δx, consider the two partial derivatives computed at p2,

Dividing these two partial derivatives and using the definition of the slope (rise divided by run) gives us the desired formula for 

where the negative sign accounts for the fact that p1 lies behind p2 relative to the wave's motion. Thus, the wave's velocity is given by

For infinitesimal Δt,  and we recover the triple product rule

See also

 
  (has another derivation of the triple product rule)
 
 
  and scalars.

References
 
 

Articles containing proofs
Laws of thermodynamics
Multivariable calculus
Theorems in analysis
Theorems in calculus